Mie goreng (meaning "fried noodles"), also known as bakmi goreng, is an Indonesian style of stir-fried noodle dish. It is made with thin yellow noodles stir fried in cooking oil with garlic, onion or shallots, fried prawn, chicken, beef, or sliced bakso (meatballs), chili, Chinese cabbage, cabbages, tomatoes, egg, and other vegetables. Ubiquitous in Indonesia, it is sold by food vendors from street-hawkers, warungs, to high-end restaurants.

History

In Indonesia, where mie goreng is one of the most widespread simple dishes, the dish's origin is clearly associated with Chinese Indonesian cuisine. Chinese influences are evident in Indonesian food such as bakmi, mie ayam, pangsit, bakso, lumpia, kwetiau goreng, and mie goreng. The dish is derived from Chinese chow mein and believed to have been introduced by Chinese immigrants in Indonesia. Despite being influenced by Chinese cuisine, mie goreng in Indonesia has a definite Indonesian taste and has been heavily integrated into Indonesian cuisine, through, for example,  the application of sweet soy sauce that adds mild sweetness,a sprinkle of fried shallots, and spicy sambal.  Pork and lard are eschewed in favour of shrimp, chicken, or beef to cater to the Muslim majority.

Preparation
Mie goreng is traditionally made with yellow wheat noodles, stir-fried with chopped shallots, onion, and garlic with soy sauce seasoning, egg, vegetables, chicken, meat or seafood. However, other versions might use dried instant noodles instead of fresh yellow wheat noodles. A common practice in Indonesia is the inclusion of the powdered instant noodle seasonings, along with egg and vegetables. Authentic mie goreng uses fresh ingredients and spices; however, bottled instant spice paste might be used for practical reasons.

The almost identical recipe is often used to create other dishes. For example, bihun goreng is made by replacing yellow wheat noodles with bihun (rice vermicelli), while kwetiau goreng uses kwetiau (thick flat rice noodles) instead.

Variations

A number of mie goreng variants exist. In Indonesia mie goreng variants are usually named after the ingredients, while some might be named after the region of origin.
 Mie goreng ayam or common mie goreng uses chicken with shallots, garlic, leek, sweet soy sauce, egg, and vegetables typically added as well.
 Mie goreng ayam penyet mie goreng topped with ayam penyet smashed fried chicken with sambal.
 Mie goreng sapi, similar to common traditional mie goreng, but uses beef instead.
 Mie goreng kambing uses goat meat or mutton.
 Mie goreng kerang uses clam.
 Mie goreng udang uses shrimp.
 Mie goreng seafood uses seafood which includes mixture of fish, squid, and shrimp. 
 Mie goreng Aceh a mie goreng variant from Aceh province, which uses a thicker noodle similar to that of spaghetti, and employs a curry-like rich spicy paste.
 Mie goreng Jawa from Central Java, employ sweet soy sauce, egg, chicken, and vegetables. In restaurant, warung or travelling food vendor, it usually sold and offered together with mie rebus (lit. "boiled noodle") or mie Jawa. 
 Mie goreng tek-tek refer to mie goreng sold by travelling street hawkers that hitting the wok making "tek-tek" sounds to announce their wares. It is common in Jakarta and some large cities in Java, where street food hawkers commonly sell it together with nasi goreng (fried rice) and mie rebus from their food carts.
 Mie goreng dhog-dhog also known as Mie goreng Surabaya from Surabaya city. Refer to travelling food cart vendor selling mie goreng Surabaya that uses large wooden slit drum instead to announce his presence in the neighbourhood, thus creates "dhog-dhog" sounds.

 Indomie Mi goreng the instant version of mie goreng, Indomie Mi goreng is also popular in Indonesia and other countries, notably Netherlands, Nigeria, Australia, New Zealand, United States and several Middle Eastern countries. This instant version however, is not technically goreng (stir-fried), but boiled instead and seasoned after discarding the water used for boiling. Nevertheless, it tries to closely resemble the authentic mie goreng by adding sweet soy sauce and crispy fried shallot. It is commonly found in warung Indomie stalls that sell instant noodles, grilled sandwiches and hot drinks in Indonesian urban areas.

Indonesians tend to name similar foreign dishes as mie goreng, for example in Indonesia, chow mein is often called mie goreng Tionghoa and yakisoba is called mie goreng Jepang.

Gallery

See also

 Mie kuah
 Mie ayam
 Indonesian cuisine
 Bakmi
 Bamischijf

References

Indonesian cuisine
Acehnese cuisine
Indonesian Chinese cuisine
Javanese cuisine
Street food in Indonesia
Indonesian noodle dishes
Surinamese cuisine